This is a list of the 11 members of the European Parliament for Lithuania in the 2014 to 2019 session.

List

Notes

Lithuania
List
2014